Copenhagenization is an expression which was coined in the early nineteenth century, and has seen occasional use since. The expression refers to a decisive blow delivered to a potential opponent while being at peace with that nation. It originated from the Royal Navy's bombardment of Copenhagen in 1807, during the Napoleonic Wars. The term is not recorded in either the Merriam-Webster or the Oxford English dictionaries.

Background
In 1807, the United Kingdom was at war with France, and Napoleon Bonaparte had created an embargo known as the Continental System to strike at Britain's overseas trade. Denmark–Norway was neutral in the war, but was believed to be leaning towards joining the embargo; also, her sizeable navy and geographic position at the entrance to the Baltic, which was located in the path of Britain's trade route with her ally, Sweden. In August 1807 Britain chose to attack Denmark, landing an army on Zealand which invaded Copenhagen and commenced bombarding the city after the Danish king refused to surrender his fleet. Denmark was forced to capitulate and surrender her fleet anyway: after the British withdrawal Denmark joined in an alliance with France against Britain and Sweden, but without a fleet she had little to offer.

First use of the term
The term "Copenhagenization" first appeared in an article in the Philadelphia Aurora in February 1808, which suggested British spies had traduced Denmark and would do so in America also: 
'Her spies and agents here are pursuing the same course and expect the same consequences. 
Our cities will be Copenhagenized — and our ships, timber, treasury, etc. will be amicably deposited in Great Britain'

In April William Cobbett made a robust response in his weekly Political Register:
'Oh, that example of Copenhagen has worked wonders in the world ! It will save a deal of strife, war, and bloodshed. I (would) like to see the name of that city become a verb in the American dictionary. "Our cities will be copenhagenized" is an excellent phrase. It's very true, that Sir John Warren would copenhagenize New York with very little trouble...'

Further uses
The term "Copenhagenization" appeared in several American sources during the 19th century. 
In 1830, the American author Richard Emmons published an Epic poem on the late war of 1812, The Fredoniad, or Independence preserved in which he wrote of the merits and risks of independence:

Aw'd by the naval sceptre of the king—
Our fleet would Copenhagenize each town,
And with the torch burn every hamlet down. 

The term was later used by Justin Winsor in his Narrative and critical history of America (1888) where he described the outfitting of independent vessels to warfare being done somewhat covertly, in order to avoid said vessels being "Copenhagenized at once by the invincible British Navy" at the outbreak of hostilities.

In the 1881 Political Science, Political Economy, and the Political History of the United States, John J. Lalor, editor, wrote:
But, even when the [embargo] was repealed in 1809, the belief that Great Britain would "Copenhagenize" any American navy which might be formed was sufficient to deter the democratic leaders from anything bolder than non-intercourse laws, until the idea of invading Canada took root and blossomed into a declaration of war.

In 1993 Azar Gat, in War In Human Civilization, used the term twice, referring to "Britain's reluctance to copenhagenize the German Navy" prior to the First World War, and again that "the fall of France led the British to copenhagenize the French Navy" with their attack on Mers-el-Kébir.

Explanation
The term "Copenhagenization" is best seen as a type of shorthand used by historians, by making comparison to a distinct and well-known incident. For example, a writer could describe an army as seeking to "do a Cannae", or say that a navy was "Trafalgared", in order to avoid a lengthy description.

However, the bombardment of Copenhagen is of less value in this regard, as Copenhagen was the scene of another battle six years earlier, when under similar circumstances the Royal Navy attacked a Danish fleet lying at anchor. In this battle, three Danish ships were sunk and twelve captured. In the bombardment of 1807, every Danish vessel present was either captured or destroyed by the British.

Although the writer in the Aurora in 1808, and Emmons in 1830, were clear enough in referring to the 1807 incident, it is less clear which was meant by Lalor and Winsor, while the modern uses by Azar Gat are better understood as references to the events of 1801.

References 

History of Copenhagen
Conflicts in 1807
1807 in Denmark
Royal Dano-Norwegian Navy
Military terminology
Metaphors referring to places
Denmark–United Kingdom relations